Ray Sinel is a New Zealand former rugby league footballer who represented New Zealand in the 1968 World Cup.

Playing career
A member of the Ellerslie club, Sinel played for combined Eastern United side in the Auckland Rugby League competition. In 1963 he won the Rothville Trophy as Auckland's player of the year. He was an Auckland representative and was part of the Auckland side that defeated Australia 15-14 in 1969.

Sinel was first selected for the New Zealand national rugby league team in 1963. He went on to play in ten test matches for New Zealand and was part of the squad for the 1968 World Cup.

References

Living people
New Zealand rugby league players
New Zealand national rugby league team players
Auckland rugby league team players
Rugby league centres
Rugby league second-rows
Rugby league locks
Ellerslie Eagles players
Year of birth missing (living people)